Corey Robinson (born May 21, 1992) is a former American football offensive tackle. He played college football at South Carolina, and was drafted by the Detroit Lions in the seventh round of the 2015 NFL Draft. He has also played for the Carolina Panthers and Jacksonville Jaguars.

College career
Robinson began his college career at South Carolina as a transition player from offensive line to defensive line, before permanently switching back to offensive line as a redshirt sophomore in 2012. He logged 35 career starts in 38 games during his time as a Gamecock.

Professional career

Detroit Lions
Robinson was drafted by the Detroit Lions in the seventh round, 240th overall, in the 2015 NFL Draft. He made his NFL debut in Week 1 of the 2015 season against the San Diego Chargers before being inactive for the remainder of the season.

Robinson was placed on injured reserve on January 3, 2017 with a foot injury.

On September 12, 2017, Robinson was placed on injured reserve with a foot injury. He was activated off injured reserve to the active roster on November 11, 2017.

Carolina Panthers
On September 1, 2018, the Lions traded Robinson to the Carolina Panthers for a draft pick. He was released by the Panthers on September 25, 2018.

Jacksonville Jaguars
On November 19, 2018, Robinson was signed by the Jacksonville Jaguars.

Washington Redskins
On July 27, 2019, Robinson was signed by the Washington Redskins. He was waived on August 31, 2019.

References

External links 
Jacksonville Jaguars bio
 Detroit Lions bio
 South Carolina Gamecocks bio

1992 births
Living people
American football offensive tackles
Carolina Panthers players
Detroit Lions players
Jacksonville Jaguars players
Washington Redskins players
People from Havelock, North Carolina
Players of American football from North Carolina
South Carolina Gamecocks football players